Mesotymolus was an ancient Roman and Byzantine-era city on the Hermus River in ancient Lydia.

The city was the seat of an ancient bishopric which remains a vacant titular see to this day.

Traditionally, its site has been connected with ruins near Takmak, Eşme, modern scholars treat Mesotymolus as unlocated.

References

Catholic titular sees in Asia
Dioceses established in the 1st century
Populated places in ancient Lydia
Roman sites in Turkey
Populated places of the Byzantine Empire
Lost ancient cities and towns